Gráinne McGoldrick is a camogie player. She won a camogie All Star award in 2009.

See also

 Gráinne (given name)

References

Derry camogie players
Year of birth missing (living people)
Living people